Yauli may refer to:

 Yauli Province
 Yauli District, Huancavelica
 Yauli District, Jauja
 Yauli District, Yauli